Ahuntsic-Cartierville is a federal electoral district in Quebec, Canada, that has been represented in the House of Commons of Canada since 2015.

Ahuntsic-Cartierville was created by the 2012 federal electoral boundaries redistribution and was legally defined in the 2013 representation order. It came into effect upon the call of the 42nd Canadian federal election, scheduled for 19 October 2015. It was created from parts of Ahuntsic (80%) and Saint-Laurent—Cartierville (20%).

Geography
The riding comprises the borough of Ahuntsic-Cartierville in Montreal, excluding the neighbourhood of Sault-au-Récollet, which is part of the neighbouring riding of  Bourassa.

Demographics
According to the Canada 2016 Census

 Languages: (2016) 64.0% French, 10.4% English, 7.0% Arabic, 2.7% Spanish, 2.3% Armenian, 2.0% Greek, 1.7% Italian, 0.9% Vietnamese, 0.9% Romanian, 0.8% Creole, 0.7% Tamil, 0.7% Urdu, 0.6% Cantonese, 0.5% Mandarin, 0.5% Portuguese

Members of Parliament

Election results

References

Federal electoral districts of Montreal
Ahuntsic-Cartierville